Adam Klein may refer to:

 Adam Klein (swimmer) (born 1988), American swimmer
 Adam Klein (tenor) (born 1960), American opera singer
 Adam Klein (writer) (born 1962), American writer and musician
 Adam Klein (Survivor contestant) (born 1991), winner of Survivor: Millennials vs. Gen X

See also
Adam Kline (born 1944), member of the Washington State Senate
Adam W. Kline (1818–1898), American manufacturer, banker and politician from New York